is a Japanese manga series scripted by Yoshihiko Tomizawa and illustrated by Hiroyuki Kaidō. It was adapted into an anime series produced by Sunrise, NAS, and TV Tokyo.

Plot
Onmyō Taisenki literally translates to 'The Chronicles of the Great Yin-Yang War'. Also, the show itself can be split into four seasons (13 episodes each), each with its distinct story, purpose, and goals.

Anime
The Onmyō Taisenki anime was produced by Sunrise, a subsidiary of Namco Bandai Holdings. It has a total of 52 episodes, and was aired weekly in TV Tokyo (from 6:00pm to 6:30pm) from September 30, 2004, to September 29, 2005. It replaces the series Aqua Kids and then was replaced by series Kotencotenco.

Storyline of Anime

 is a 12-year-old Japanese boy who lives near Tokyo. Never having met his parents, he lives an ordinary life with his adoptive grandfather. His grandfather had taught him a series of strange hand movements, which Riku did not know the purpose of until the day his grandfather is attacked near his shrine. But it is not an ordinary attacker.

As Riku's grandfather decides to leave the house for a journey, the 10-year-old boy  and the 10-year-old girl  rent rooms in Riku's house. The 17-year-old man, Masaomi, who teaches Riku the secrets of Onmyōdō (such as the use of Tōjinfu, for example), drops by eventually. The three of them have 'contracts' with Shikigami.

; attempting to open the four ; and freeing , a boy who was born with the power to control , and had been imprisoned for thousands of years.

The Shikigami
Onmyō Taisenki shows monsters called Shikigami. There are 24 families of Shikigami (three per family for a total of 72) to represent each Solar term. These monsters are extremely powerful, and their  are activated when their owners use certain sequences of In. Every Shikigami has its own In sequences and some have special weapons, which are also activated by the In. Every Shikigami has its own name and a class/family. Class names are usually named after gods and flowers.

Although Nazuna says that a true Daikōjin occurs when Mind-Technique-Body are together, Riku has been able to summon one when he is highly desperate and emotional (usually when Kogenta is about to be killed). Shikigami can also transform into Daikōjin form by forcing a Tōjin stone into a Shikigami, as Isou does to his Shikigami, Fuji, in Episode 20 (or by inserting a special chip made from the Tōjin stones into the drive). However, these methods only produce a confused and pained Daikōjin and causes the Drive to sprout coils that will eventually kill the Tōjinshi if the Daikōjin is not defeated. In addition, members of the obliterated sect Jin-ryū have been able to change their Shikigami into Daikōjin by using lengthy series of In.

Later, Kibachiyo and his partner gain the Master Drive and could also transform into a Chōkōjin.

When a Drive is activated for the first time, the Shikigami will appear behind a shōji and asks what the owner desires, and if it is to the Shikigami's liking, it will accept and a contract will be formed. Once the terms of the contract have been fulfilled, the Tōjinshi and Shikigami will part. Similar events happen with Riku in Episode 23–24, as he rejects his contract with Kogenta and consequently does not remember people he only met after he formed the contract, but still remembers his childhood friend Momo.

Episode List

Season 1

Season 2

Season 3

Season 4

Characters

Ten-ryū

The main character of the show, Riku was born in the Heian Era of Japan as Youmei. His mother sent him into the future, where he was taken up by Sōtarō Tachibana, to avoid dying in the Chi-Ryū raid on the Ten-Ryuu shrine. At the start of the series, he is shy and easily scared. But when he receives the Ten-Ryū Tōjin drive containing Kogenta, Kogenta helps him to become a lot braver and stronger. He has no memory of his time in the Heian era until he goes to Naraku to reunite with Kogenta after losing him by Yūma and Rangetsu. In Naraku, he sees his memory play in front of him, and learns of his past life. He is the head of the Ten-Ryū.

The shikigami of Riku Tachibana. Kogenta is a member of the Byakko (White Tiger) family of shikigami (leading many to the conclusion that Riku is Ten-Ryū's Head). He is typically cocky, arrogant, and quick to anger. At first he cannot believe that he's "Stuck with someone as dimwitted" as Riku, but eventually comes to terms with this and tries to improve Riku's character. He is the first Shikigami to become a Daikōjin, but he considers it an unfair advantage because, in his words, "I can't remember how I beat them and by the time I come to, the fight's already over." Later, Kogenta and Riku learned that Kogenta was the one who killed Riku's parents, but Kogenta couldn't remember as he became a Daikoujin the moment his contract was formed. However, Riku forgives Kogenta.  In the finale, Kogenta willingly lets Riku terminate their contract, but in reality the contract still lingers, as Kogenta's spirit is seen over the shrine

The first real member of the Ten-Ryū that Riku and Kogenta meet. Teru is broke, and nearly always in debt to someplace (A Hot Spring Hotel, a Beach Bar, and others). He is always happy to receive free food (on account of him being unable to buy his own), and always travels as "Training" as he calls it, normally leaving as soon as someone tells him the rent for wherever he is staying. He even develops a crush on Nazuna, who shows him the literal meaning of "crush". He considers Souma a rival (as both love Nazuna), and only enters the Fukumaden as leader of the Yōkai Extermination Squad formed by Chi-Ryū.

Voice actors

Manga
The Onmyou Taisenki manga is published by Jump Comics and runs monthly in V-Jump magazine (2005). Each volume is nine chapters and three have been published: the first one (192 pages) published on October 10, 2004, the second one (200 pages) on August 4, 2005, and the third one (267 pages) on March 3, 2006. The manga has the collaboration of WiZ and Bandai. Each volume costs about 400 Yen (Price inside Japanese territory).

Storyline of Manga
The Onmyou Taisenki manga does not tell the same history as the anime. The story happens years before the events in the anime. The main character, Yakumo (who also appears on the anime, as a teenager) is the son of Monju, the chief priest of the Taihaku Temple, in Kyoto. Yakumo also trains the In, with a baseball ball. The problems start when Mahoroba escapes, gains power, and transforms Monju into stone. Yakumo is called by a Zero Drive, which was one of the treasures of the temple. This Zero Drive handles Byakko no Kogenta. The story of the manga is about Yakumo's first steps with a Shikigami, training with Idzuna (Taihaku Temple's shrine maiden) and seeking Mahoroba through various Japanese historical dates. Famous Japanese historical characters such as Oda Nobunaga can be seen on the manga. The story is cited by Kogenta around episode 35 in the anime. However, not many details are given.

Factual differences with the anime
Even when the story of the Manga and Anime appears to be in the same universe there are some factual differences in the world of the anime and manga.
In the manga the names of the shikigamis are created by their Toujinshi at the time of the contract and in the anime the names of the shikigamis are always the same. For example, in the manga the name of the shikigami that once made a contract with Monju is revealed to be "Byakko no Akatsuki", and then it's revealed that is in fact the same shikigami as "Byakko no Kogenta", and the name Kogenta is the name that Yakumo gave him. In contrast the anime reveals that the name of Byakko no Kogenta has been always the same, as is revealed in the anime when the story of the contract between Byakko no Kogenta and Raihou is told. 
Also, in the manga, there are no factions between the Toujinshi, and every Toujinshi is independent.
Even when in the anime almost every Toujinshi uses a Drive, in the manga almost every Toujinshi uses a Toujinki, with the exception of Yakumo who gets his Zero Drive from the Naraku in the middle of Volume 2 in order to save Kogenta because Yakumo's Toujinki is destroyed, and Tsukuyomi that summons his shikigami with Toujin-fu.
It also is revealed in the manga that the Drive is in fact a Toujinki prototype.
In the anime when the Toujinshi shikigami is defeated the Toujinshi loses his/her memories as Toujinshi and he/she can no longer be a Toujinshi. In the manga the only consequence of a Shikigami defeat is that the Toujinshi can no longer make a contract with that shikigami.

Video games
There are three Onmyou Taisenki games, being two for PlayStation 2, and one for Game Boy Advance.
The first PS2 game is called , and was released on March 31, 2005. The PlayStation 2 EyeToy is required to play this game.
The second PS2 game is called , and was released on June 26, 2005. It is a side-story with the same characters from the anime, where Kogenta and Riku train and become stronger through five , which are parallel worlds with many . The 'Gold' element from Onmyoudou is also featured in the game, but there is no Fukumaden for it. 
The only game for GB Advance is called , and was released on December 12, 2004. 
All the three games were released in Japan only.

Note

External links
  Official Onmyō Taisenki portal
 

2004 anime television series debuts
Bandai Entertainment anime titles
Shueisha manga
Sunrise (company)
TV Tokyo original programming
TVB